In animal anatomy, a cloaca, plural cloacae (  or  ), is the posterior orifice that serves as the only opening for the digestive, reproductive, and urinary tracts (if present) of many vertebrate animals. All amphibians, reptiles and birds, and a few mammals (monotremes, tenrecs, golden moles, and marsupial moles), have this orifice, from which they excrete both urine and feces; this is in contrast to most placental mammals, which have two or three separate orifices for evacuation. Excretory openings with analogous purpose in some invertebrates are also sometimes referred to as cloacae. Mating through the cloaca is known as cloacal copulation, commonly referred to as cloacal kiss.

The cloacal region is also often associated with a secretory organ, the cloacal gland, which has been implicated in the scent-marking behavior of some reptiles, marsupials, amphibians, and monotremes.

Etymology 
The word is from the Latin verb cluo, "(I) cleanse", thus the noun cloaca, "sewer, drain".

Birds

Birds reproduce using their cloaca; this occurs during a cloacal kiss in most birds. Birds that mate using this method touch their cloacae together, in some species for only a few seconds, sufficient time for sperm to be transferred from the male to the female. For some birds, such as ostriches, cassowaries, kiwi, geese, and some species of swans and ducks, the males do not use the cloaca for reproduction, but have a phallus.

One study has looked into birds that use their cloaca for cooling.

The cloaca in birds may also be referred to as the vent.  Among falconers the word vent is also a verb meaning "to defecate".

Fish
Among fish, a true cloaca is present only in elasmobranchs (sharks and rays) and lobe-finned fishes. In lampreys and in some ray-finned fishes, part of the cloaca remains in the adult to receive the urinary and reproductive ducts, although the anus always opens separately. In chimaeras and most teleosts, however, all three openings are entirely separated.

Mammals
With a few exceptions noted below, mammals have no cloaca. Even in the marsupials that have one, the cloaca is partially subdivided into separate regions for the anus and urethra.

Monotremes
The monotremes (egg-laying mammals) possess a true cloaca.

Marsupials

In marsupials (and a few birds), the genital tract is separate from the anus, but a trace of the original cloaca does remain externally. This is one of the features of marsupials (and monotremes) that suggest their basal nature, as the amniotes from which mammals evolved possessed a cloaca, and the earliest animals to diverge into the mammalian class would most likely have had this feature, too.

Unlike other marsupials, marsupial moles have a true cloaca, a fact that has been used to argue against a marsupial identity for these mammals.

Placentals
Most adult placental mammals have no remaining trace of the cloaca. In the embryo, the embryonic cloaca divides into a posterior region that becomes part of the anus, and an anterior region that has different fates depending on the sex of the individual: in females, it develops into the vestibule that receives the urethra and vagina, while in males it forms the entirety of the penile urethra. However, the tenrecs and golden moles, small placental mammals native to Africa, as well as some shrews retain a cloaca as adults.

Being placental animals, humans only have an embryonic cloaca, which is split up into separate tracts during the development of the urinary and reproductive organs. However, a few human congenital disorders result in persons being born with a cloaca, including persistent cloaca and sirenomelia (mermaid syndrome).

Reptiles
In reptiles, the cloaca consists of the urodeum, proctodeum, and coprodeum. Some species have modified cloacae for increased gas exchange (see Reptile respiration and Reptile reproduction). This is where reproductive activity occurs.

Cloacal respiration in animals

Some turtles, especially those specialized in diving, are highly reliant on cloacal respiration during dives. They accomplish this by having a pair of accessory air bladders connected to the cloaca which can absorb oxygen from the water.

Various fish, as well as polychaete worms and even crabs, are specialized to take advantage of the constant flow of water through the cloacal respiratory tree of sea cucumbers while simultaneously gaining the protection of living within the sea cucumber itself. At night, many of these species emerge from the anus of the sea cucumber in search of food.

See also
 Cloaca (embryology)

References

Animal anatomy
Bird anatomy
Sex organs
Animal reproductive system